Roberto Rivellino (also Rivelino, ; ; born 1 January 1946) is a Brazilian football pundit and retired footballer. He was one of the stars of Brazil's 1970 FIFA World Cup winning team. Rivellino currently works as a pundit for Brazilian TV Cultura.

The son of Italian immigrants from Macchiagodena (Isernia), he was famous for his large moustache, bending free kicks, long range shooting, accurate long passing, vision, close ball control and dribbling skills. He also perfected a football move called the "flip flap", famously copied by Romário, Mágico González, Ronaldo, Ronaldinho and Cristiano Ronaldo in recent years. A former attacking midfielder, he is widely regarded as one of the most graceful football players ever, and one of the greatest players of all time. With the close control, feints and ability with his left foot, Diego Maradona named Rivellino among his greatest inspirations growing up. In 2004, he was named by Pelé in the FIFA 100 list of the world's greatest living players.

Club career
Rivellino was born in São Paulo, and started as a futebol de salao player at Clube Atletico Barcelona. After that, he tried his luck with Barcelona's biggest rival, Corinthians, where he moved on to professional football and quickly became a favourite of the fans—and was therefore nicknamed "O Rei do Parque" (King of the Park) (after the club's home ground, Parque São Jorge). However, the late 60s and early 70s were one of the most troubled periods in the history of the club, which did not win a single São Paulo state league title between 1954 and 1977.

In 1974, after Corinthians was defeated by arch-rivals Palmeiras in the São Paulo league finals, as the star player Rivellino was singled out by most fans as one of the most responsible for not winning. He moved on to Rio de Janeiro, where he defended Fluminense until the end of the 1970s. Rivellino was undoubtedly the greatest star in the excellent Fluminense of the mid 70s, dubbed "the tricolor machine", among Doval, Pintinho, Gil and Carlos Alberto Torres. He won the Rio de Janeiro league championship in 1975 and 1976. By the end of the decade, he moved on to play for Al Hilal in Saudi Arabia; he retired from professional football in 1981.

International career

Rivellino was a key member of Brazil's 1970 FIFA World Cup winning team, which is often cited as the greatest-ever World Cup team. Wearing the number 11 jersey, Rivellino was deployed on the left side of midfield and scored 3 goals, including the powerful bending free-kick against Czechoslovakia, which earned him the nickname "Patada Atómica" (Atomic Kick) by Mexican fans. Rivellino also played in the 1974 and 1978 FIFA World Cups, finishing in fourth and third place respectively.

After retirement

After his professional retirement, Rivellino started a career as a football commentator and coach (he has managed Shimizu S-Pulse in Japan's J. League). Rivellino further represented Brazil in the 1989 edition of the World Cup of Masters, scoring in the final against Uruguay. Rivellino is sometimes credited with scoring the fastest goal in football history when he supposedly scored a goal direct from the kick-off after noticing the opposition goalkeeper on his knees finishing off pre-match prayers.

Regarding the 2014 FIFA World Cup held in his country, Rivellino criticized the inclusion of the Amazonian city of Manaus with its stadium Arena da Amazônia in the hosting venues, saying "it’s absurd to play in Manaus. You start sweating the moment you leave the locker room".

Career statistics

Club

Managerial statistics

Honours
Corinthians
 Torneio Rio – São Paulo: 1966

Fluminense
 Campeonato Carioca: 1975, 1976

Al Hilal
 Kings Cup (Saudi Arabia): 1980

Brazil
 FIFA World Cup: 1970

Individual
 FIFA World Cup All-Star Team player: 1970
 Bola de Prata Brazilian Championship All-Star Team: 1971
 CONMEBOL All-Star Team: 1973
 Bronze ball South American Footballer of the Year: 1973, 1976
 Silver ball South American Footballer of the Year: 1977
 FIFA 100 Greatest Living Footballers: 2004
 Premio Golden Foot Award (Football Legend Award): 2005
 The Best of The Best – Player of the Century: Top 50
 World Soccer: 38th Greatest Player of the 20th Century
 IFFHS Brazilian Player of the 20th Century (12th place)
 Brazilian Football Museum Hall of Fame

References

External links

Brazilian Football Museum Hall of Fame
 Rivellino Sport Center
 Rivellino from the Confederação Brasileira de Futebol
 IMNO Interviews Rivelino
 Corinthians All Time Best XI Placar Magazine
 

1946 births
Living people
FIFA 100
Brazilian footballers
Brazilian football managers
Brazilian people of Italian descent
Campeonato Brasileiro Série A players
Sport Club Corinthians Paulista players
Sociedade Esportiva Palmeiras players
Fluminense FC players
Al Hilal SFC players
Footballers from São Paulo
1970 FIFA World Cup players
1974 FIFA World Cup players
1978 FIFA World Cup players
FIFA World Cup-winning players
Expatriate football managers in Japan
J1 League managers
Shimizu S-Pulse managers
Brazil international footballers
Brazilian expatriate footballers
Expatriate footballers in Saudi Arabia
Association football midfielders
Saudi Professional League players
Brazilian expatriate sportspeople in Saudi Arabia
Brazilian expatriate sportspeople in Japan